Michael Broadbank (also known as Broadbanks) (born 23 September 1934 in Hoddesdon, England) is a former international motorcycle speedway rider who made 560 appearances for the Swindon Robins, scoring over 4,200 points.

Rye House
Broadbank was first discovered at the Rye House track after working there as a young boy. In the 1950s the track was threatened with closure so Broadbank built a new track on an adjacent site to continue training. After a season the owner of the stadium relented and Broadbank built the track on the site that is still there today.

The training track operated a team known as the Roosters, however, with the involvement of Broadbank, the team were renamed the Red Devils, with reference to the red leathers worn by Broadbank, when almost all riders wore black.

Career
After impressing at Rye House he managed to get a full-time ride with the Wembley Lions. He then started his long association with Robins before moving on to the Hackney Hawks, Reading Racers and the Stoke Potters. Whilst with Robins he captained the side to the British League title in 1967. He reached the final of the Speedway World Championship on five occasions.

Broadbank was also a regular visitor to Australia and won the Australian Individual Speedway Championship at the Rockhampton Speedway in 1963, to date the last time a rider from England won the Australian title. Broadbank defeated Queensland rider Keith Gurtner, and a rising star from New Zealand named Ivan Mauger, to win the title.

In 2006 Broadbank was awarded a belated testimonial for sixteen years of service with Swindon.

World Final Appearances
 1958 -  London, Wembley Stadium - 12th - 5pts
 1961 -  Malmö, Malmö Stadion - 16th - 2pts
 1962 -  London, Wembley Stadium - 15th - 2pts
 1964 -  Göteborg, Ullevi - 9th - 6pts
 1965 -  London, Wembley Stadium - Reserve - Did not ride
 1966 -  Göteborg, Ullevi - 13th - 4pts
 1967 -  London, Wembley Stadium - Reserve - Did not ride

References

1934 births
Living people
British speedway riders
English motorcycle racers
Swindon Robins riders
Hackney Hawks riders
Wembley Lions riders
Stoke Potters riders
Rye House Rockets riders
Oxford Cheetahs riders
Reading Racers riders
Crayford Kestrels riders
Newport Wasps riders
Poole Pirates riders
People from Hoddesdon